Harlan Ala'alatoa (born 7 January 1988) is an Australian former professional rugby league footballer who played for the Canterbury-Bankstown Bulldogs in 2013.

Playing career
Born in Sydney, Alaalatoa played his junior football for the Bankstown Bulls before being signed by the Canterbury-Bankstown Bulldogs. He played for the Bulldogs' NYC team in 2008.

In Round 5 of the 2013 NRL season, Alaalatoa made his NRL debut for the Bulldogs against the Manly-Warringah Sea Eagles.

References

External links

Canterbury Bulldogs profile

1988 births
Living people
Australian rugby league players
Australian people of Māori descent
Australian sportspeople of Samoan descent
Canterbury-Bankstown Bulldogs players
Rugby league second-rows
Rugby league locks
Rugby league players from Sydney